Easky Lough, also known as Easkey Lough or Lough Easky, is a freshwater lake in the northwest of Ireland. It is located in west County Sligo in the Ox Mountains.

Geography

Hydrology
Easky Lough is fed by mountain streams entering at the lake's southeastern end. The lake drains north into the Easky River, which flows north to the Atlantic Ocean near Easky village.

Natural history
Fish species in Easky Lough include brown trout, salmon and the critically endangered European eel. Easky Lough is part of the Ox Mountains Bogs Special Area of Conservation.

See also
List of loughs in Ireland

References

Easky